Incredible is the third studio album by Gary Puckett & The Union Gap, released in 1968. In contrast to their first two albums, which used cover versions of hit songs for about half their content, Incredible consists entirely of new songs written by the band members themselves and/or their producer, Jerry Fuller. The album landed on the Billboard 200 chart, reaching No. 20, being the group's top charting album.

The song "Lady Willpower" was released in June 1968 and hit No. 2 on the Billboard Hot 100 and No. 26 on the adult contemporary chart.  The song "Over You" was released in September 1968 and hit No. 7 on the Billboard Hot 100, No. 3 on the adult contemporary chart.

Track listing 
All songs arranged by Al Capps except where noted.

Personnel
Gary Puckett & The Union Gap
Dwight Bement - tenor saxophone [uncredited], organ, piano, bass
Kerry Chater - bass, backing vocals, lead vocal on "Take Your Pleasure", rhythm guitar
Gary Puckett - lead vocals (except on "Take Your Pleasure"), lead and rhythm guitars
Paul Wheatbread - drums, percussion
Gary "Mutha" Withem - organ, piano, backing vocals, lead vocal on "Take Your Pleasure"

Additional personnel
James Burton - rhythm guitar
Al Casey - rhythm guitar
Mort Marker - rhythm guitar
Joe Porcaro - percussion
Gene Estes - percussion
Jerry Fuller - production
Tom Morgan - harmonica
Dorothy Remson - harp
Gayle Levan - harp
Sid Sharp - strings

Chart positions

Singles

References

1968 albums
Gary Puckett & The Union Gap albums
Columbia Records albums